Pseudoerinna jonesi is a species of fly in the family Pelecorhynchidae.

References

Pelecorhynchidae
Insects described in 1919
Taxa named by Ezra Townsend Cresson
Diptera of North America